Friedrich Wilhelm "Fred" David, an Austrian Jew, who became the most significant aircraft designer for the Australian aircraft industry during World War Two; having been one of only a few people to have worked for both sides (Allies and Axis powers) in designing aircraft used during the war. David's most famous aircraft was the CAC Boomerang used by the Royal Australian Air Force during the Pacific War.

As an Austrian Jew who had recently arrived in Australia in 1939 as a refugee, David was technically an enemy alien, so he had to report to the local Police Station weekly having been interned by Australian immigration officials. David was well-suited to the CAC project, since he had previously worked for Heinkel in pre-Nazi Germany, as well as Mitsubishi and Aichi Kokuki in Japan.  His design contributions in Japan resulted in the Mitsubishi A5M Claude fighter and the Aichi D3A Type 99 Val dive-bomber.

Fred David worked on several projects throughout the war but his most technically advanced aircraft never got past the prototype stage, the CAC CA-15 Kangaroo piston fighter. The project was commissioned in early 1943 to overcome the speed and aeronautical limitations of the CAC Boomerang but the prototype did not fly until March 1946. However, despite the aircraft exceeding the maximum speed and climb rate of the Spitfire and Mustang, it was now obsolete with the dawn of the jet age.

Bibliography

See also
 Commonwealth Aircraft Corporation
 CAC Boomerang
 CAC Woomera
 CAC Wirraway
 CAC Wackett
 CAC CA-15
 List of aircraft of the Royal Australian Air Force

Notes

1898 births
1992 deaths
Australian aerospace engineers
Australian Jews
Austrian emigrants to Australia